Agapanthia verecunda is a species of beetle in the family Cerambycidae. It was described by Chevrolat in 1882.

References

verecunda
Beetles described in 1882